The 2013 Norwegian Football Cup Final was the 108th final of the Norwegian Football Cup. The final was contested by Rosenborg and Molde and took place on 24 November 2013 at Ullevaal Stadion in Oslo.

Route to the final

(TL) = Tippeligaen team
(D1) = 1. divisjon team
(D2) = 2. divisjon team
(D3) = 3. divisjon team

Match

Details

See also
2013 Norwegian Football Cup
2013 Tippeligaen
2013 Norwegian First Division
2013 in Norwegian football

References

External links 
 Cup final at Fotball.no

2013
Rosenborg BK matches
Molde FK matches
Football Cup
November 2013 sports events in Europe
Sports competitions in Oslo
2010s in Oslo
Final